Nyanyadzi (also Nyanadzi) is a village in Chimanimani District of Manicaland Province in Zimbabwe. It is located 96 km south of Mutare on the main Mutare-Birchenough Bridge road, at the confluence of the Nyanyadzi, Odzi, and Save rivers. The region is under irrigation and there are high yields of grain and fruit crops.

Chimanimani District
Populated places in Manicaland Province